Thomas Ayshe (died 1587), of Batcombe and Bath, Somerset, was an English politician.

He was a Member (MP) of the Parliament of England for St Germans in 1572 and for Bath in 1584 and 1586.

References

Year of birth missing
1587 deaths
People from Mendip District
People from Bath, Somerset
English MPs 1572–1583
English MPs 1584–1585
English MPs 1586–1587